Abul Hashem is a Bangladeshi Awami League politician. He was formerly the Member of Parliament for Dhaka-11.

Career
Hashem was elected to parliament from Dhaka-11 as an Awami League candidate in 1973.

In February 2020, the Bangla Tribune reported that Hashem was unable to receive medical treatment due to financial problems.

References

Awami League politicians
Living people
1st Jatiya Sangsad members
1930 births